Jughead (also known as Archie's Pal Jughead) is an ongoing comic book series featuring the Archie Comics character of the same name. The character first appeared in Pep Comics #22 (cover dated December 1941). Jughead proved to be popular enough to warrant his own self-titled ongoing comic book series which began publication in January 1949.

Publication history

Jughead first appeared in Pep Comics #22 in 1941 (also Archie's first appearance) and later grew into his own title Archie's Pal Jughead Comics in 1949, which also guest-starred Archie and his friends. Common story themes included Jughead's insatiable appetite for hamburgers, avoiding Big Ethel who has a crush on him and outsmarting his nemesis Reggie Mantle.

The official title was shortened to Jughead with issue #122 in July 1965.  In #325, Cheryl Blossom made her second appearance after debuting in Archie's Girls Betty and Veronica that same month.  The original Jughead series ended with #352 (June 1987).

Jughead returned with a relaunched #1 in August 1987.  In issue 46 (June 1993), the Jughead title was renamed Archie's Pal Jughead Comics similar to the previous volume.  Also, in this issue Jughead finds out that his mother is expecting a baby.  In issue 50, the baby girl, nicknamed "Jellybean" is born.  The second volume ended in 2012 with issue #214.

A third series, titled Jughead, was released in October 2015 as part of Archie Comics' New Riverdale. It is written by Chip Zdarsky with artwork by Erica Henderson. Derek Charm took over as regular artist starting with issue #7.

First appearances

Collected Editions
Volume 1

Volume 3

References

 Jughead comics in the Grand Comics Database
 Archie Universe

Comics magazines published in the United States
Archie Comics titles
1949 comics debuts
2012 comics endings
2015 comics debuts
Teen comedy comics
Romantic comedy comics